In a sufficiently hard interaction between particles, the cross section can be factorized into parton distribution functions (PDFs), the hard scattering part, and fragmentation functions. The fragmentation functions, as are the PDFs, are  non-perturbative functions describing the production of a given observed final state. In a leading order picture, it can be interpreted as the probability that the observed final state originates from a given quark or gluon.

See also
Proton structure function

References

Functions related to probability distributions